The 2008 Walsall Metropolitan Borough Council election took place on 1 May 2008 to elect members of Walsall Metropolitan Borough Council in the West Midlands, England. One third of the council was up for election and the Conservative Party stayed in overall control of the council.

After the election, the composition of the council was:
Conservative 33
Labour 18
Liberal Democrats 6
Independent 2
Democratic Labour Party 1

Election result

Ward results

References

2008 English local elections
2008
2000s in the West Midlands (county)